Judith "Judy" Ward is a member of the Pennsylvania State Senate, representing the 30th Senatorial district in Blair County, Pennsylvania. She is registered as Republican.

Education and career
Ward graduated from Hollidaysburg High School and acquired a nursing degree from Altoona Hospital School of Nursing. She held a job as a registered nurse for 22 years, then for Allegheny Lutheran Social Services, for Bishop Guilfoyle Catholic High School, and as medical, health and wellness coordinator at Ward Transport and Logistics. She founded All About Towne, a relocation assistance company. Ward is also a graduate of the Pennsylvania State University's Rural and Urban Leadership (RULE) Program.

Political career
In 2014 Ward was elected to represent the 80th District in the Pennsylvania House of Representatives, the first woman elected from the district. In July 2018 she won the Republican Party nomination for the election to succeed John Eichelberger representing the 30th District in the Pennsylvania State Senate; the Democratic nominee was also a woman, Emily Garbuny Best.
On November 6, 2018, State Representative Judy Ward won the 30th State Senatorial District Seat, replacing Hon. Senator John Eichelberger. On January 1, 2019 Senator-elect Ward was sworn into office, as the first female state senator from the Pennsylvania 30th Senatorial District

Political Positions 
Judy Ward claims to be one of the most consistently reliable conservative votes in the Pennsylvania Senate since her election, and her record has earned her the support of numerous conservative groups including: the Pro-Life Federation of Pennsylvania, the National Rifle Association, and the conservative business entrepreneurs organization Commonwealth Partners. She has earned the "Award for Conservative Achievement" from the American Conservative Union.

Personal
Ward and her husband Bill have two sons.

References

External links
Official Web Site
PA House profile

Living people
People from Blair County, Pennsylvania
Republican Party Pennsylvania state senators
21st-century American politicians
Year of birth missing (living people)